Shikaripalya is one of the localities in Electronics City at Bangalore, the capital of the Indian state of Karnataka. It is located near Wipro Technologies in Electronics City. 

Shikariplya is near by Neotown- Bangalore is a 120-acre integrated township comprising three residential precincts, a business precinct, a tech icon precinct, a hospitality and leisure precinct, and an educational precinct. It has a beautiful natural lake within the township and is very conveniently located in electronic city, Bangalore. Its Pin code is 560105.

The other important layout nearby Shikariplya is Upkar Medows, Celebrity-Layout, Mahindra Elena. 
 India Cricket

Neighbourhoods in Bangalore